Clinton High School is a public high school located in Albany, Kentucky, United States. Clinton County High School is part of the Clinton County school district.

References

External links
 Clinton County High School

Education in Clinton County, Kentucky
Public high schools in Kentucky
Buildings and structures in Clinton County, Kentucky